Municipal Pier may refer to:
 Navy Pier, Chicago
 Municipal Pier (San Francisco)